Adjágas, from Sápmi, Norway are Sámi joikers, Lawra Somby and Sara Marielle Gaup with a band of musicians. The group's name Adjágas is a Sámi word describing the mental state experienced between waking and sleeping.

Adjágas was scheduled to open the 2005 Glastonbury Festival Pyramid Stage, but due to a flooding incident that caused electrical problems, their set was cancelled. However, they returned in 2007 to open the Pyramid Stage.

Discography
 Adjágas (2005)
 Mánu Rávdnji (2009)
 Nordic Woman (2012)

Band members
 Lawra Somby (vocals/yoik)
 Sara Marielle Gaup (vocals/yoik)
 Espen Elverum Jakobsen (guitar)
 Åsmund Wilter Eriksson (bass)
 Aleksander Kostopoulos (drums/percussion)
 Petter Marius Gundersen (horns/banjo)

References

External links
Adjágas' new website
Adjágas' Website
Adjágas' MySpace page.
Music Information Center Norway

Norwegian folk musical groups
Sámi musical groups
Musical groups established in 2004
2004 establishments in Norway

Musical groups from Norway with local place of origin missing